Paly may refer to:
 In heraldry, variation of the field with a pattern of pallets (vertical bars)
 A local nickname for Palo Alto High School in Palo Alto, California, USA